The 2015–16 Atlantic 10 Conference men's basketball season was the 40th season of Atlantic 10 Conference basketball. The 2016 Atlantic 10 men's basketball tournament was held at the Barclays Center in Brooklyn, New York.

Dayton, VCU, and St. Bonaventure tied for the regular season championship. Saint Joseph's won the A-10 Tournament.

As a result of winning the A-10 Tournament, Saint Joseph's earned the conference's automatic bid to the NCAA tournament. Dayton and VCU earned at-large bids to the tournament as well.

St. Bonaventure, George Washington, and Davidson all received bids to the NIT. Fordham received a bid to the CollegeInsider.com Tournament.

Preseason

Preseason poll

Preseason All-Conference Teams

Regular season

Conference matrix
This table summarizes the head-to-head results between teams in conference play. Each team played 18 conference games: 1 game vs. 8 opponents (4 home, 4 away) and 2 games against 5 opponents (home and away).

Conference Awards

Postseason

Atlantic 10 tournament

*Game times in Eastern Time. #Rankings denote tournament seeding.

NCAA tournament

The Atlantic 10 Conference had three bids to the 2016 NCAA Men's Division I Basketball Tournament.

National Invitation tournament 

St. Bonaventure, George Washington, and Dayton earned NIT bids for the conference.

CollegeInsider.com tournament 

Fordham earned the sole bid to the CIT for the conference.

References